Dauri Michell Moreta (born April 15, 1996) is a Dominican professional baseball pitcher for the Pittsburgh Pirates of Major League Baseball (MLB). He has previously played in MLB for the Cincinnati Reds.

Career

Cincinnati Reds
Moreta signed with the Cincinnati Reds as an international free agent on March 16, 2015. He spent the 2015 season with the Dominican Summer League Reds, going 1–2 with a 1.69 ERA and 30 strikeouts over  innings. He split the 2016 season between the AZL Reds and the Billings Mustangs, going a combined 3–3 with a 1.89 ERA and 56 strikeouts over  innings. He split the 2017 and 2018 seasons between Billings and the Dayton Dragons; going a combined 1–2 with a 4.31 ERA and 45 strikeouts over  innings in 2017, and 4–3 with a 6.79 ERA and 79 strikeouts over  innings in 2018. Moreta spent the 2019 season with the Daytona Tortugas, going 1–0 with a 2.35 ERA and 64 strikeouts over  innings. Following the 2019 season, he played for the Glendale Desert Dogs of the Arizona Fall League. Moreta did not play in 2020 due to the cancellation of the Minor League Baseball season because of the COVID-19 pandemic. Moreta split the 2021 minor league season between the Chattanooga Lookouts and the Louisville Bats, going a combined 6–0 with a 1.02 ERA and 58 strikeouts over 53 innings. 

On September 22, 2021, Cincinnati selected Moreta's contract to the 40-man roster and promoted him to the major leagues for the first time. Moreta made his MLB debut on September 26, tossing a scoreless inning of work against the Washington Nationals.

Pittsburgh Pirates
On November 18, 2022, Moreta was traded to the Pittsburgh Pirates in exchange for Kevin Newman.

References

External links

1996 births
Living people
People from Comendador, Dominican Republic
Major League Baseball players from the Dominican Republic
Dominican Republic expatriate baseball players in the United States
Major League Baseball pitchers
Cincinnati Reds players
Dominican Summer League Reds players
Arizona League Reds players
Billings Mustangs players
Dayton Dragons players
Daytona Tortugas players
Glendale Desert Dogs players
Chattanooga Lookouts players
Louisville Bats players